Kintampo refers to the following locations in Ghana:

Kintampo District, a former district in the Brong Ahafo Region that was split into two parts in 2003
Kintampo South District
Kintampo North Municipal District
Kintampo, Ghana, the capital town of Kintampo North District
Kintampo Complex, a prehistoric archaeological complex that emerged in West Africa
Kintampo waterfalls, a waterfall in Ghana

Kintampo also have Senior High School, which is located at Kyeremankoma